Ayala Procaccia (born 1941) is a retired Israeli Justice of the Supreme Court of Israel. Before being elected to the Supreme Court in 2001, she served as a judge in the Jerusalem Magistrates’ Court until 1993 and in the Jerusalem District Court from 1993 to 2001. While active in the Israeli law courts, Ayala Procaccia worked to change Israeli law to champion equality for all, regardless of gender or religion. Proponents of Procaccia say that she strives for an equitable and just society; critics of her work said that she promoted a judicial dictatorship over the government.

Biography
Procaccia was born in Kibbutz Ashdot Ya'akov to a German father, Hanan Aynor, and a Polish mother, Yaffa Puterman-Efrat (Rodstein). She was an only child, and attended public schools in Tel Aviv. 

Procaccia served in the Israel Defense Forces between 1959 and 1961. She graduated from the Hebrew University of Jerusalem with an LL.B. degree in 1963 (distinction) and a master's degree in 1969 (distinction). Following her graduation, she served as legal assistant to Chief Justice Simon Agranat for four years. In 1969, she moved to the United States to pursue a Doctor of Juridical Science degree (S.J.D.) at the University of Pennsylvania Law School. Upon her graduation in 1972, she returned to Israel and became the legal assistant to the Attorney General. In 1983, she was appointed legal adviser to the Securities and Exchange Commission of Israel. She was appointed judiciary in 1987, and served in both the Jerusalem Magistrates' Court and in the Jerusalem District Court until 2001. She supported the right of children in East Jerusalem and said that children's right to free education in East Jerusalem is not being met     

In 2001 she was elected to the Supreme Court of Israel where she served until her retirement in 2011. In 2005, she appeared at Boston University, Harvard Law School, and Brandeis University, to discuss with the Boston area about the Israel’s democracy and human rights. Following her retirement, she said she planned to remain active. In 2023, she demonstrated this by calling for and partaking in a protest against the override clause, where people were worried that the Knesset would have too much power should the bill be passed.

Procaccia was married to Uriel Procaccia (whom she divorced in 1991) and has two children, Oren (b. 1971) and Yuval (b. 1974).

Court Rulings 
Her first supreme court case was in 2002, regarding soldiers in the Israel Defense Forces, and exemption of service for specific individuals, wherein the supreme court ruled to deny the petition, subjecting the individuals to serving in the military reserve service.

A notable court case in 2003, regarding the film "Jenin, Jenin" led to a supreme court ruling that it should not be censored out of theaters, and the public should be able to make judgements for themselves.

In 2008, in the case Center for Jewish Pluralism v. Ministry of Education, Procaccia ruled that the education system does not need to fund religious educational establishments.

Additionally, In 2011, Procaccia and two other judges ruled against a several billion dollar long standing lawsuit in Clalit Health Services against tobacco companies, saying that rather than sue the tobacco industry, they should sue on behalf of each individual who was harmed. These judges did not deny that these tobacco companies have had a negative effect on the health of members of Clalit Health Services.

Her final ruling as a supreme court justice was to absolve an Interior Ministry regulation, that made foreign workers lose their work permit on the occurrence of childbirth or pregnancy. This concluded her work as a supreme court justice, and she was dismissed in a formal ceremony with the other supreme court justices, family, and friends, leaving her supreme court seat to be filled. This supreme court seat would be filled by Noam Sohlberg. The compiled list of supreme court cases with Procaccia is shown below.

References

External links 
 "Israeli Law, the Security Fence and the Disengagement: Litigation before the Supreme Court" (Lecture given at Boston University School of Law)

Living people
1941 births
Israeli women judges
Israeli Jews
Hebrew University of Jerusalem Faculty of Law alumni
Judges of the Supreme Court of Israel
University of Pennsylvania Law School alumni